David Bergeaud (born 1968 in Paris, France) also known as "KOR", is a film, television, and video game composer, as well as a record producer and multi-instrumentalist.  Bergeaud has composed scores for such noteworthy projects as the PlayStation franchise Ratchet & Clank series and the award-winning television series Strong Medicine and The Outer Limits, and the controversial feature-length documentary film, Kurt & Courtney.

David Bergeaud has lent his musical talents on some of the most critically acclaimed projects produced and directed by the likes of renowned director Steven Spielberg (Earth 2), Ang Lee (Lust, Caution), Bob Zemekis (Death Becomes Her),  Barry Josephson (Secret Agent Man), Walter Salles (The Motorcycle Diaries), Jane Campion (In the Cut), Alejandro González Iñárritu (21 Grams), Barry Levinson (Sphere), Mike Figgis (Miss Julie), Roman Polanski (The Pianist), George Miller (Lorenzo's Oil), Curtis Hanson (River Wild), Bill Brillstein (C-16: FBI) Brad Grey (C-16: FBI) and Raffaella De Laurentiis (Dragon: The Bruce Lee Story, Vanishing Son).

Early life
David Bergeaud was born in Paris. His father a successful stage director/choreographer and his mother Christine Nerac, a well known singer, raised him while on tour through much of Europe, the Middle East and East Africa.  David began his musical education at the age of 5 and, after ten years of classical conservatory and private studies, moved to Los Angeles to explore jazz and contemporary electronic music.

Awards and nominations
BMI Film Music Award

NOMINATIONS
(2003; Strong Medicine)
(2004; Strong Medicine)

WINS
(2003; Strong Medicine)
(2004; Strong Medicine)

Game soundtracks
Disruptor (1996)
Running Wild (1998)
Ratchet & Clank (2002)
Ratchet & Clank: Going Commando (2003)
Ratchet & Clank: Up Your Arsenal (2004)
Ratchet: Deadlocked (2005)
Resistance: Fall of Man (2006)
Ratchet & Clank: Size Matters (2007)
Ratchet & Clank Future: Tools of Destruction (2007)
Secret Agent Clank (2008)
Ratchet & Clank Future: Quest for Booty (2008)
Medieval Moves: Deadmund's Quest (2011)
PlayStation Move Heroes (2011)
Sports Champions 2 (2012)
WARMACHINE: Tactics (2014)

Film soundtracks
Savage Harbor (1987)
The Unnamable (1988)
Twice Dead (1988)
Street Soldiers (1990)
The Unnamable II: The Statement of Randolph Carter (1993)
College Kickboxers (1992)
Vanishing Son (1994)
Midnight Run for Your Life (1994)
Another Midnight Run (1994)
Donor Unknown (1995)
Kinda Cute for a White Boy... (1996)
Psycho Sushi (1997)
Prince Valiant (1997)
Sins of the Mind (1997)
On the 2nd Day of Christmas (1997)
Via Satellite (1998)
Mr. Headmistress (1998)
Wrongfully Accused (1998)
Brookfield (1999)
All You Need (2001)
The Badge (2002)
Hangman's Curse (2003)
Set Point (2004)
Anonymous Rex (2004)
Dame sobh (2005)
Thr3e (2006)
The Visitation (2006)
Will-Endowed (2008)
Iranian Chronicles (2008)

Television soundtracks
Earth 2 (1994)
The Outer Limits (1995)
C-16: FBI (1997)
FreakyLinks (2000)
Secret Agent Man (2000)
Strong Medicine (2000)
Tales from the Neverending Story (2001)
FreakyLinks (2001)
The D.A. (2004)
Bollywood Hero (2009)

Documentary soundtracks
Aileen Wuornos: The Selling of a Serial Killer (1992)
Tracking Down Maggie (1994)
Heidi Fleiss: Hollywood Madam (1996)
Kurt & Courtney (1998)
The Spider Wrangler: The Spiders of Hangman's Curse (2004)
Frank Peretti: From Page to Screen (2004)
The Glass House (2009)
American Coup (2010)

References

External links
Official site of David Bergeaud, musipolis.com
New site of David Bergeaud, bergeaud.com

1968 births
French film score composers
French multi-instrumentalists
French television composers
Living people
French male film score composers
Male television composers
Video game composers